= Pennine Reach =

Pennine Reach is a bus rapid transit scheme in Blackburn and Accrington, Lancashire, England. The scheme was approved by the Department for Transport in October 2013.

== Infrastructure ==
The scheme includes new bus lanes in Blackburn, and new bus stations in Blackburn and Accrington.

An evaluation in 2020 found that the scheme improved the reliability of journey times, and increased passenger numbers on routes 6 and 7.
